Cylindrepomus grammicus is a species of beetle in the family Cerambycidae. It was described by Francis Polkinghorne Pascoe in 1860. It is known from Fiji, Moluccas, Indonesia, the Solomon Islands, Australia, Papua New Guinea, and Sulawesi.

Varietas
 Cylindrepomus grammicus var. acuminatus Schwarzer, 1926
 Cylindrepomus grammicus var. latefasciatus Breuning, 1940
 Cylindrepomus grammicus var. oxypterus Fairmaire, 1879
 Cylindrepomus grammicus var. waigeuensis Gilmour, 1950

References

Dorcaschematini
Beetles described in 1860